The discography of American hardcore rapper, record producer, actor and author Fredro Starr, best known as a member of multi-platinum hardcore rap group Onyx, consists of 4 solo studio albums, 3 compilation albums, 4 soundtrack albums, 14 singles.

In 1984, Fredro Starr started as a breakdancer, he goes by the name Magic. In late 1985 Fredro Starr decided to become a street poet under the name Kool Fredro. In 1988, after graduating from school at the age of 17, Fredro Starr created the rap group Onyx along with his schoolmates Big DS and Suavé (also known as Sonny Seeza). In 1991, Fredro Starr was discovered by the late great hip hop legend Jam Master Jay of Run-D.M.C. who signed Onyx on his legendary label JMJ Records. In the same year Sticky Fingaz joined the group. Onyx went on to release three top selling albums before Fredro began his solo career. As a part of Onyx, Fredro Starr was nominated as "Rap/Hip-Hop New Artist" on American Music Awards and won "Best Rap Album" on Soul Train Music Awards.

Albums

Studio albums

Compilation albums

Mixtapes

Soundtrack albums
 November 9, 1999: Light It Up
 December 19, 2000: Save the Last Dance
 July 14, 2009: A Day in the Life
 July 2, 2018: China Salesman (Music Inspired from the Motion Picture)

Singles

As lead artist

As lead artist (Free singles)
2003: "So Called Beef (50 Cent Diss)"
2004: "Thug Love"
2004: "Wifey" (No Chorus Demo)
2008: "Heaven Records"
2008: "No He Didn't"
2009: "Blood (a.k.a. Rahs Wake)"

Guest appearances
1998: "Xtreme" All City - Metropolis Gold
1999: "Ghetto's a Battlefield" Blaze - Light It Up (soundtrack) 
1999: "Serious Shit"Blaze Da Golden Jaw - Next Year / Serious Shit / Dual Action
2001: "Get It Up" Sticky Fingaz - Blacktrash: The Autobiography of Kirk Jones
2001: "Don't Be Afraid" Jerzey Mob - Outlawz Present Jerzey Mob Vol. 1
2003: "I Don't Know" Sticky Fingaz - Decade: "...but wait it gets worse"
2004: "Smoke As Life" Grandmasta Vic feat. Fredro Starr & Mr Cheeks)
2006: "Ride For The Block" Various Artists - Straight Out Da Hood
2008: "The Greatest" Ruler Divine feat. Fredro Starr, Mr. Cheeks
2009: "International Thug" Mal Da Udal - International Thug
2009: "Vodka Rap" Mal Da Udal - International Thug
2009: "Queens - Ростов" Песочные Люди (feat. Fredro Starr & БТР) - Сухое Горючее
2009: "Black Bagz (100MAD Anthem Remix)" Chi King, Planet Asia, Fredro Starr & I$aid
2009: "100 Mad Gang (Slam Again)" Skotadistes (Greece) feat. Fredro Starr
2009: "Can You Hear Me" Various Artists (Detroit Diamonds, Fredro Starr & Sticky Fingaz) - A Day In the Life (The Soundtrack)
2009: "Mexican Standoff" Various Artists (Fredro Starr, Michael K. Williams & Sticky Fingaz) - A Day In the Life (The Soundtrack)
2009: "The Setup #2" Various Artists (Fredro Starr, Malik Barnhardt, Melinda Santiago, Mezmo, Sticky Fingaz & Tony Hussle) - A Day In the Life (The Soundtrack)
2009: "The Assassination" Various Artists (Bokeem Woodbine, Fredro Starr & Hassan Johnson) - A Day In the Life (The Soundtrack)
2009: "Can't Live Forever" Various Artists (Bokeem Woodbine, Fredro Starr & Keith Robinson) - A Day In the Life (The Soundtrack)
2009: "The Airport" Various Artists (Bokeem Woodbine, Faizon Love, Fredro Starr, Melinda Santiago, Michael Rapaport, Sticky Fingaz & Tyrin Turner) - A Day In the Life (The Soundtrack)
2010: "Queens - Ростов" [Capella (За Полк) Remix] Песочные Люди (feat. Fredro Starr & Смоки Мо) - Горючая Смесь (Альбом Ремиксов)
2010: "Queens - Ростов" [DJ Superman] Песочные Люди (feat. Fredro Starr) - Горючая Смесь (Альбом Ремиксов)
2010: "Hustle101" Roc C – Scapegoat
2010: "Time Is Money" Ese Lonely (feat. Chi King & Fredro Starr) - Time Is Money
2010: "Time Is Money" Stranga The Great (feat. Chi King & Fredro Starr) - Time Is Money
2010: "Multy" Chi-King - The Big Heist
2010: "100MAD Anthem" Rah Bigalow - Bigalow Doctrine Part II Ruff
2010: "Nobody Fear You" <small>I$aid feat. Fredro Starr and Chi King</small>
2011: "Time Is Money" Stranga The Great (feat. Chi King, Fredro Starr, 12 O' Clock, and Illwerd) - Time Is Money
2011: "That's Us" Rah Bigalow (feat. Fredro Starr, Snak The Ripper & Chi King) - The Wack Rapper Assassinator
2011: "Knuckle Up" Milez Grimez Ft. Fredro Starr & Rock (Of Heltah Skeltah)
2011: "Celebrate" Fredro Starr & Layzie Bone - Fire Squad [EP]
2011: "Fire Squad" Fredro Starr & Layzie Bone - Fire Squad [EP]
2011: "Going In For The Kill" Fredro Starr & Layzie Bone - Fire Squad [EP]
2011: "SMASHIN'" W.d.B.m. (Jay Monaco & Ray Ray Intl) feat. Fredro Starr
2011: "SMASHIN'" (Italian Remix) W.d.B.m. (Jay Monaco & Ray Ray Intl) feat. Fredro Starr & Duke Montana
2012: "Turn Da Heat Up" Krazy Drayz (of Das EFX) - Showtime
2012: "The Legacy" Snowgoons ft. Esoteric, Ill Bill, Godilla, Fredro Starr (of Onyx), Sicknature, Punchline, Reks, Thirstin Howl the 3rd, Planetary (of Outerspace, Virtuoso, Maylay Sparks, Swann, Sav Killz, M-Dot & Reef The Lost Cauze - Snowgoons Dynasty
2012: "100MadSouth" B-HI
2012: "My Purpose" Young Noble - Outlaw Rydahz Vol. 1
2012: "Wie die Zeit vergeht" Eko Fresh - Ek to the Roots
2012: "Everybody Wins" T.O.B. - תהילה
2013: "Panic Room" Dope D.O.D. - Da Roach
2013: "Laughing To The Bank" J. Thaddeus - The Disgruntled Gentleman
2013: "Reality Rap" Skripture - Still Standing
2014: "My Brother's Keeper" Young Noble & Hussein Fatal of Outlawz, Sticky Fingaz & DJ Kay Slay - Outlaw Nation Vol. 4
2014: "Unholy" Reks (feat. Fredro Starr & Ruste Juxx) - Eyes Watching God
2015: "Kill 'em All" Merkules - Scars
2015: "Till" Mic Check feat. Fredro Starr & Hason - Str8Biz Legendz - EP
2015: "Goonavision" Savage Brothers - Freedom Or Death
2016: "LuCypher" by Reel Wolf (feat. Fredro Starr, Ghettosocks, Sars, Kid Fade, Sean Strange, Swifty Mcvay & DJ Tmb) from Reel Wolf The Underworld 22016: "Greca (cold world)" by Nigheddò Awamakers (feat. Fredro Starr) from Nigheddò Awamakers Retròvirus2016: "Nasty's World" by A$AP Mob (feat. A$AP Nast & Fredro Starr) from A$AP Mob Cozy Tapes, Volume 12016: "Team Death Match" by Snowgoons (feat. Diabolic, Chino XL, Lil' Fame, Fredro Starr & Justin Tyme) from Snowgoons Goon Bap2017: "Bamboo Skit" by A$AP Twelvyy (feat. Fredro Starr) from A$AP Twelvyy 122017: "The War" by Alphamale (feat. Fredro Starr) from Alphamale The Battleground2017: "Journey" by Larceny (feat. Fredro Starr & Metaphorz) from Larceny The Last Boyscout2017: "Journey [Remix]" by Larceny (feat. Fredro Starr & Metaphorz)
2018: "Tomorrow Ain't Promised" by Evante & Fredro Starr from China Salesman (Music Inspired from the Motion Picture)2018: "Running from Reality" by Optimystic (feat. Kali Ranks, Rampage & Fredro Starr) from Optimystic Salty Waterz2018: "Still Fakin' The Funk" by Neek The Exotic (feat. Fredro Starr) from Neek The Exotic Hell Up In Queens2018: "Wreck Boulevard" by NiCE Supreme (feat. Fredro Starr) from NiCE Supreme Loud Pack From Paris'' (EP)

Music videos
2001: "Dat Be Dem/Dyin For Rap" | Directed by Jeff Byrd
2001: "Perfect Chick" | Directed by Jeff Byrd
2003: "California Girls"
2012: "180 On The Dash" | Directed by David Tikva
2012: "All Or Nothing" (feat. Begetz) | Directed by David Tikva
2012: "February" | Directed by 416PRINCEBEATZ
2012: "Made In The Streets" | Directed by The Visionariez
2012: "Private Jet To Heaven" | Directed by David Tikva
2012: "Bout That / Die 2day" | Directed by Dave Manigault & Fredro Starr
2013: "Change Up / End Of The Day" | Directed by Dave Manigault & Fredro Starr
2013: "Lock and Key / Everything I Love" | Directed by Dave Manigault & Fredro Starr
2013: "U Make Me Flyer / Top Floor" | Directed by Dave Manigault & Fredro Starr
2013: "What If 2" (Original Video) | Directed by Andre Sigur & Only1RichHustle
2014: "What If 2" | Directed by JB Adkins
2014: "Everyday Hell" | Directed by JB Adkins
2014: "That New York" | Directed by Angel "OZ" Navarro
2014: "Polo Wars" | Directed by Angel "OZ" Navarro
2016: "The Truth" | Directed by Angel "OZ" Navarro
2018: "Firestarr 2" (Short Movie) | Directed by Fredro Starr and Michal Nemtuda | Edited by Boris Beharka
2018: "South America" | Directed by Fredro Starr and Pandora Films

References

External links
 Fredro Starr at Discogs

Hip hop discographies
Discographies of American artists